"We Did But Now You Don't" is a song written by Pat McManus, Woody Bomar and Berni Clifford, and recorded by American country music artist Conway Twitty.  It was released in September 1982 as the first single from the album Dream Maker.  The song reached #2 on the Billboard Hot Country Singles & Tracks chart.

Chart performance

References

1982 singles
Conway Twitty songs
Song recordings produced by Jimmy Bowen
Elektra Records singles
1982 songs
Songs written by Pat McManus (songwriter)